The Taiwan Security Enhancement Act was a US Congressional bill which never became law. It was passed by one of the Houses of the U.S. Congress, the House of Representatives, on February 1, 2000, by a vote of 341 to 70. It envisaged greater United States military support of the Republic of China/Taiwan, including training and equipment.  It also contemplated establishing direct military communication lines between the United States and Taiwan. It was never approved by the U.S. Senate or signed into law by the U.S. president.

Its proponents intended the  proposed law to strengthen and update the Taiwan Relations Act, which was passed soon after the US ceased official relations with the Republic of China (now commonly known as Taiwan) on December 31, 1978, and instead recognized the People's Republic of China on January 1, 1979. President Jimmy Carter had unilaterally withdrawn from the Sino-American Mutual Defense Treaty establishing a defense pact between the United States and the Republic of China in January 1979, and the Taiwan Relations Act was Congress's response to enforce  and prevent excessive unilateral foreign policy change at the hands of the President without consent of Congress.

U.S. President opposed proposed law
The U.S. president at the time, Bill Clinton, opposed the proposed legislation.  However, most Democrats in Congress supported the legislation despite President Clinton's opposition.

Beijing response
The Chinese Government's spokesperson, responding to press inquiries, gave the Beijing Government's response as follows:

See also
 Political status of Taiwan
 China–United States relations
 Taiwan–United States relations

External links
 Text of the Taiwan Security Enhancement Act
 Library Of Congress Bill Summary 

Taiwan Security Enhancement Act
Taiwan Security Enhancement Act
Taiwan–United States relations
China–United States relations
2000 in international relations